Joe Johnson may refer to:

Sports

American football
Joe Johnson (wide receiver) (born 1962), former American football wide receiver for the Washington Redskins and Minnesota Vikings
Joe Johnson (defensive end) (born 1972), former American football defensive end for the New Orleans Saints and Green Bay Packers
Joe Johnson (running back) (1929–2003), American football player for the Boston Patriots and Green Bay Packers
Joe Johnson (American football coach)
Joe Johnson or Joe Little Twig (1893–1939), American football player

Association football
Joe Johnson (footballer, born 1882) (1882–?), English footballer
Joe Johnson (footballer, born 1903), English footballer for Scunthorpe and Bradford City
Joe Johnson (footballer, born 1911) (1911–1983), England international footballer
Joe Johnson (footballer, born 1920) (1920–2005), Scottish footballer
Joe Johnson (English footballer), English footballer

Other sports
Joe Johnson (Australian footballer) (1883–1934), Australian rules footballer
Joe Johnson (baseball) (born 1961), American former Major League Baseball pitcher
Joe Johnson (basketball) (born 1981), American basketball player
Joe Johnson (snooker player) (born 1952), English former snooker player
Joe Lee Johnson (1929–2005), American race car driver

Other
Jo Johnson (born 1971), British politician
Joe Johnson (cartoonist), early gay cartoonist

See also
Joel Johnson (disambiguation)
Joseph Johnson (disambiguation)
Joe Johnston (born 1950), American film director